Karaslavov is a Bulgarian surname. Notable people with the surname include:
 Asen Karaslavov (born 1980), former Bulgarian footballer
 Georgi Karaslavov (1904–1980), Bulgarian writer
 Slav Khristov Karaslavov (1932–2002), Bulgarian writer, journalist and poet

References 

Bulgarian-language surnames